The Yono-class submarine (occasionally confused with Yugo-class) is a class of North Korean miniature submarines, produced for domestic use as well as for export. Also referred to as the Yeono class, these submarines displace 130 tons, significantly less than North Korea's larger 1,800-ton s. As of May 2010, North Korea is reported to operate ten of these submarines. Iran is reported to have at least one Yono submarine and to have copied the design as the Ghadir-class.

Design
The Yono-class submarine was first created in 1965.

Combat involvement

A Yono-class submarine is thought to have fired the torpedo attack which sank a South Korean ,  on 26 March 2010 in South Korean waters. According to some investigators, the weapon used in the attack was a North Korean-manufactured CHT-02D torpedo, from which substantial propulsion parts were recovered.

High ranking North Korean military officials denounced the international investigation and said the North does not have the type of submarines that supposedly carried out the attack. They also dismissed claims regarding writings on the torpedo and clarified that "when we put serial numbers on weapons, we engrave them with machines." South Korea's Yonhap News quoted South Korean officials as saying the North has about ten of the Yeono-class submarines.

A member of the North Korean cabinet who defected to South Korea in 2011, said on 7 December 2012 that the crew of the North Korean submarine which sank Cheonan had been honored by the North Korean military and government. The defector, known by the alias "Ahn Cheol-nam", stated that the captain, co-captain, engineer, and boatswain of the mini-sub which sank Cheonan had been awarded "Hero of the DPRK" in October 2010.

References 

Submarines of the Korean People's Navy
Midget submarines